Kosher is an American punk rock band formed in 1995 in Warrensburg, Missouri, United States. They have released two studio albums. The current band members are Remi Remlinger on bass guitar and vocals, Trent White and Josh Jordan on guitars and vocals, and Rob Garrow on drums. Their second album Self Control was released on BYO Records.

Discography

Studio albums 
 Self Control (2001)
 The CD (1997)

Live albums 
 Live at Davey's Uptown (2002)

Compilation albums 
 Somewhere Near, Someone Dear (2001)

EPs 
 Death to Drama (2000)
 Bored in America (1999)

References 

American punk rock groups
Rock music groups from Missouri
BYO Records artists